Tandy Darby (born October 11, 1973) is an American politician serving as a member of the Tennessee House of Representatives from the 76th district. He assumed office on November 3, 2020.

Education 
After graduating from the Greenfield School in Greenfield, Tennessee, Darby earned a Bachelor of Science degree in agricultural business from the University of Tennessee at Martin.

Career 
Since 1997, Darby has worked as a salesman for Akin & Porter Produce Inc. In 2008, he co-founded Greenfield Laser Industries, a fabrication business. Darby was elected to the Tennessee House of Representatives on November 3, 2020. In February 2021, Darby was selected as one of seven deputy whips of the Tennessee House.

References 

1973 births
Living people
People from Weakley County, Tennessee
University of Tennessee at Martin alumni
Republican Party members of the Tennessee House of Representatives
21st-century American politicians